In Greek mythology, Amatheia (Ancient Greek: Ἀμάθεια means 'rears, nurses' or 'she is sparkling water') was the "fair-tressed" Nereid and was described to have "azure locks luxuriant" or as some translations put it "long, heavy hair". As one of these 50 sea-nymphs, she was the daughter of the 'Old Man of the Sea' Nereus and the Oceanid Doris. Variations of her names were Æmathia, Amathea and Amathia which means  "queen of voice".

Mythology 
Amatheia and her other sisters appeared to Thetis when she cries out in sympathy for the grief of Achilles for his slain friend Patroclus.

Notes

References 

 Gaius Julius Hyginus, Fabulae from The Myths of Hyginus translated and edited by Mary Grant. University of Kansas Publications in Humanistic Studies. Online version at the Topos Text Project.
 Homer, The Iliad with an English Translation by A.T. Murray, Ph.D. in two volumes. Cambridge, MA., Harvard University Press; London, William Heinemann, Ltd. 1924. . Online version at the Perseus Digital Library.
 Homer, Homeri Opera in five volumes. Oxford, Oxford University Press. 1920. . Greek text available at the Perseus Digital Library.

Nereids
Deities in the Iliad